Karrar Nabeel Hussein Al-Janat (born 16 January 1998) is an Iraqi footballer who plays as a midfielder for Al-Quwa Al-Jawiya in the Iraqi Premier League.

International career
On 26 March 2019, Nabeel made his first international cap with Iraq against Jordan in the 2019 International Friendship Championship.

Honours

Club
Al-Quwa Al-Jawiya
 Iraqi Premier League: 2020–21
 Iraq FA Cup: 2020–21
 AFC Cup: 2018

References

External links

1998 births
Living people
Iraqi footballers
Iraq international footballers
Association football midfielders